Bal Thu Pyaing Lo Hla Par Taw Naing is a 1973 Burmese black-and-white drama film, directed by Thukha starring Zaw One, Win Hlaing, Tin Tin Nyo and Tin Tin Hla.

Cast
Zaw One as Eant Bwal
Win Hlaing as Nyunt Hlaing
Tin Tin Nyo as May Kyi
Tin Tin Hla as Tin Tin Hla
Eant Kyaw as Chit Sayar
Thein Maung as U Thein Maung

Awards

References

1973 films
1970s Burmese-language films
Films shot in Myanmar
Burmese black-and-white films
1973 drama films
Burmese drama films